"Mille Lune Mille Onde" is the second single from Italian pop tenor Andrea Bocelli's 2001 album, Cieli di Toscana.  The song was written by Francesco Sartori, Claudio Corradini and Lucio Quarantotto, the writers of Bocelli's "Con te partirò" and "Canto della Terra", and by multiple Grammy Award winner David Foster, and is among Bocelli's most popular and well-known songs. The song is used in all of Barilla's pasta commercials.

The song was later included in Bocelli's 2007 greatest hits album, The Best of Andrea Bocelli: Vivere.

References

External links
 "Mille Lune Mille Onde", on Ultratop.be.

Andrea Bocelli songs
2001 singles
Songs written by Francesco Sartori
Songs written by Lucio Quarantotto
Songs written by David Foster
2001 songs
Decca Records singles